Ignazio Paleari (13 February 1954 – 29 October 2019) was an Italian racing cyclist. He rode in the 1979 Tour de France.

References

External links
 

1954 births
2019 deaths
Italian male cyclists
Place of birth missing
People from Brianza
Cyclists from the Province of Monza e Brianza